Ecce Bombo  is a 1978 Italian  comedy film, written and directed by and starring Nanni Moretti. It was filmed in 16 mm but released in 35 mm. It was Moretti's first  commercial success.

Plot
Michele Apicella, Goffredo, Mirko and Vito are four highschool friends who were on the forefront of the political protests that characterized the second half of the 1960s. Now a few years older, the four friends are no longer politically active and struggle to come to terms with their present. Intellectually marginalized and disenchanted with contemporary society, they form a collective consciousness group to try to understand what to do with themselves. Another friend, Cesare, decides to join them although he has mixed feelings about the whole experience, leading a relatively comfortable life. Things change when Michele starts a relationship with Cesare's girlfriend Flaminia.

Cast
 Nanni Moretti - Michele Apicella
 Luisa Rossi - Michele's mother
 Glauco Mauri - Michele's father
 Lina Sastri - Olga
 Piero Galletti - Goffredo
 Susanna Javicoli - Silvia
 Cristina Manni - Cristina
 Lorenza Ralli - Michele's sister Valentina
 Maurizio Romoli - Flaminia's husband Cesare
 Carola Stagnaro - Flaminia
 Fabio Traversa - Mirko
 Giorgio Viterbo - Reporter for 'Telecalifornia'
 Paolo Zaccagnini - Vito
 Sandro Conte - Student
 Maurizio Di Taddeo - Student
 Mauro Fabretti - Student

Awards
 Nastro d'Argento: Best Story
 Nominated for the Golden Palm at the 1978 Cannes Film Festival

References

External links
 

1978 comedy films
1978 films
Films directed by Nanni Moretti
1970s Italian-language films
Italian comedy films
1970s Italian films